Leonhard Ennen, also spelled Leonard Ennen, (5 March 1820 – 14 June 1880) was a German theologian, historian and archivist born in Schleiden, in the Eifel region of modern-day Germany. He is remembered for his writings on the history of Cologne.

Family and education

Leonhard Ennen's parents were simple farmers, the equivalent of sharecroppers in German agricultural society.  From 1841 to 1844 he studied theology and philosophy at the University of Münster and the University of Bonn. Following his ordination, he served as vicar and head of the upper Stadtschule, city school, in Königswinter am Rhein, and he remained in this position from 1845 to 1857.

Archive development

While teaching at the school, he became interested in the history of Cologne. In 1849 his Geschichte der Reformation im Bereiche der alten Erzdiözese Köln appeared, in which he examined the impact of the Reformation on the archdiocese of Cologne. He followed this with his Der spanische Erbfolgekrieg und der Churfürst Joseph Clemens von Köln, a study of the War of the Spanish Succession and the role the Elector Joseph Clemens played in this contest, published in 1851. His superiors at the education ministry sent him to Paris, to study archive development and management: the fruit of this study, Frankreich und der Niederrhein, oder Geschichte von Stadt und Kurstaat Köln seit dem 30jährigen Kriege bis zur französischen Occupation, appeared in two volumes in 1855 and 1856. This study of France's relationship with the states of the lower Rhine during the Thirty Years War attracted attention to his talents as an historian, and on 1 August 1857 he was appointed director of the Historisches Archiv der Stadt Köln (Historical Archive of the City of Cologne).

With other historians, notably Anton Fahne (1805–1883), he helped to found the Historischen Verein für den Niederrhein (Historical Society of the Lower Rhine) in 1854, and served as the society's first secretary. He continued to identify, categorize, and publish volumes on the sources and documents of the history of Cologne. He died in Cologne on 14 July 1880.

Selected publications 
 Geschichte der Reformation im Bereich der alten Erzdiözese (History of the Reformation in the Domain of the Ancient Archdiocese of Cologne), 1847
 Frankreich und der Niederrhein (France and the Lower Rhine); two volumes, 1856
 Zeitbilder aus der neuern Geschichte der Stadt Köln, mit besonderer Beziehung auf Ferdinand Franz Wallraf (Pictures from the Newer History of the City of Cologne, with special reference to Ferdinand Franz Wallraf), 1857
 Quellen zur Geschichte der Stadt Köln (Sources for the History of the City of Cologne); volumes 1–6, 1850–79
 Geschichte der Stadt Köln (History of the City of Cologne); five volumes, 1863–75
 Bilder vom alten Köln: Stadtansichten d. 15. bis 18. Jahrhundert u. Beschreibung d. Zustände vom Mittelalter bis nach d. Franzosenzeit (Pictures of old Cologne: City Views from the 15th to 18th century, etc.)

References

Notes and citations

Sources
 Hermann Keussen. "Ennen, Leonhard." In: Allgemeine Deutsche Biographie. Herausgegeben von der Historischen Kommission bei der Bayerischen Akademie der Wissenschaften, Band 48 (1904), S. 380–382, Digitale Volltext-Ausgabe in Wikisource. (Version vom 26. Juni 2010, 00:21 Uhr UTC)
 Die Chronik Kölns, Chronik Verlag, Dortmund 1991, 
 Meyers Konversationslexikon, Bd. 5, Seite 665, Verlag des Bibliographischen Instituts, Leipzig und Wien, Vierte Auflage, 1885–1892

Further reading 
 Toni Diederich: Ein Plädoyer für Leonard Ennen, in: Geschichte in Köln, Heft 44 (1998), S. 153–154.
 Stephan Laux: Leonard Ennen (1820–1880), ein biographisches Porträt (In preparation).

External links
 

1820 births
1880 deaths
People from Euskirchen (district)
German archivists
19th-century German historians
19th-century German writers
19th-century German male writers
German male non-fiction writers